Kingsdown is an unincorporated community in Ford County, Kansas, United States.

History
Kingsdown was founded in 1887.

A post office in Kingsdown opened in 1888, closed in 1891, reopened in 1892, and closed again in 1893, was re-established in 1904, and closed permanently in 1994.

References

Further reading

External links
 Ford County maps: Current, Historic - KDOT

Unincorporated communities in Ford County, Kansas
Unincorporated communities in Kansas